Andriy Vitoshynskyi (born 21 February 1981) is a Ukrainian footballer who has played for Ukrainian Premier League club FC Zakarpattia Uzhhorod.

External links 

 Official Website Profile

1981 births
Living people
Ukrainian footballers
FC Desna Chernihiv players
FC Hoverla Uzhhorod players
Ukrainian Premier League players
Ukrainian First League players
Ukrainian Second League players
Ukrainian Amateur Football Championship players

Association football midfielders